Kenneth Ashbridge (12 November 1916 – 2002) was an English professional footballer who played as a goalkeeper.

Ashbridge started his career with hometown club Burnley and made his debut in the 0–4 defeat to Manchester United on 13 April 1936. He lost his place in the team immediately and could not return to the team, failing to displace regular custodian Ted Adams from the starting line-up. He left Burnley in 1938 to join Halifax Town, where he played one more league game before retiring from professional football.

References

English footballers
Association football goalkeepers
Burnley F.C. players
Halifax Town A.F.C. players
English Football League players
1916 births
2002 deaths
Footballers from Burnley